Steven F. Lukan (born December 17, 1978) is the Iowa State Representative from the 32nd District. He has served in the Iowa House of Representatives since 2002.

Lukan currently serves on several committees in the Iowa House:  appropriations, commerce, natural resources, and public safety.  He also serves as the ranking member of the Justice System Appropriations Subcommittee.

Lukan was reelected in 2006 with 8,183 votes (66%), defeating Democratic opponent Tom Avenarius.

References

External links
 Representative Steven Lukan official Iowa General Assembly site
 
Profile at Iowa House Republicans

Republican Party members of the Iowa House of Representatives
Living people
1978 births
People from Dubuque County, Iowa